Nikolay Popov (14 December 1931 – 4 February 2008) was a Russian engineer who went on to be the main designer of the renowned Soviet main battle tank, the T-80.

Early life
Popov was born on 14 December 1931, in the Ust-Labinsk district of the Russian Soviet Federative Socialist Republic.

Career
Popov's main contribution to Russian and Soviet military development came in 1976, when the first productions of the T-80 began. Popov was the main designer of the tank and the T-80 ended up looking a lot like the previous T-64 and became the main battle tank of the Soviet Union due to its advanced design, being the first tank with a turbine, multi-fuelled engine and still used by the Russian army today in its elite tank units, with over 5,404 being built until its production was terminated in 1992 by the new Russian Federation.

Death
Popov died on 4 February 2008 in Saint Petersburg, Russia.

References

External links
Chief designer of the T-80 tank dies 

1931 births
2008 deaths
Russian designers
Soviet engineers
20th-century Russian engineers
People from Ust-Labinsky District
Weapon designers
Soviet inventors